As a given name, Merry may refer to:

 Merry Anders (1934–2012), American actress born Mary Helen Anderson
 Merry Clayton (born 1948), American soul and gospel singer
 Gladys Geissmann (1908–1978), better known as Merry Hull, American accessory designer credited with the "finger-free" glove
 Merry Lepper (born 1942), American long-distance runner acknowledged to have set a world record in the marathon in 1963
Merry Lindsey, American cardiac physiologist
 Merry Brandybuck, a character in The Lord of the Rings
 Merry Pemberton, a DC Comics character
 Merry Wiesner-Hanks, American historian

See also
 Meredith (given name)